Ghaffari (Persian,غفاری) is a surname name, often associated with Iranian families from the Kashan regional-area. However the name is found all over Iran and elsewhere, as families historically Iran did not have last names until governmental policies instituted within the 20th century, hence the name can be found all over Iran, such as Mazandaran and Semnan.

People with the surname Ghaffari          

 Ghaffari Iris x-Ray Radiologist 1969 Paris France.
 Abu'l-Hasan Khan Ghaffari Kashani (also known as Sani al Mulk (Abu'l-Hasan);1814–1866), Iranian painter
 Cihangir Ghaffari (born 1940), Iranian actor and film producer
 Hadi Ghaffari (born 1950), Iranian political Ayatollah
 Siamak Matt Ghaffari, Iran-born American Olympic wrestler and mixed martial artist
 Mohammad Ghaffari (known as Kamal-Ol-Molk; 1848–1940), Iranian painter and Freemason
 Roozbeh Ghaffari, American biomedical engineer and neuroscientist
 Saeed Reza Ghaffari (born 1962), Iranian scientist and physician
 Masoumeh Ghaffari MD, Iranian American physician, surgeon

Other members of the Ghaffari family 
 Abdollah Entezam, Saltaneh, Iranian Chairman of National Iranian Oil Company, Minister of Foreign Affairs (Secretary of State)
 Farrokh Khan, 19th-century Persian Ambassador to France, politician, and Freemason

References

Surnames
Iranian families